Dubash is a surname. Notable people with the surname include: 

Navroz Dubash, Indian academic
Peshoton Dubash (1891–?), British writer
Tanya Dubash (born 1968), Indian businesswoman